Lena Chen is a feminist artist, writer, and activist based in Berlin and Los Angeles. Born in San Francisco, California, Chen studied sociology and minored in Studies of Women, Gender, & Sexuality at Harvard College. Her work addresses women's identity, trauma, and intimacy.

Work

Writing
In August 2006, she started penning the blog Sex and the Ivy. Her first-person accounts of sexual experiences, depression, and undergraduate life at one of America's premier academic institutions spurred campus discussion, prompted media attention, and garnered a following. Quickly becoming a controversial figure, she was criticized by some as morally reprehensible and praised by others for encouraging frank sexual dialogue. Her writing has appeared in The American Prospect, The Boston Globe, and The Sydney Morning Herald.

Following the publication of revenge porn by an ex-boyfriend in 2009, Chen and her partner were subject to online harassment. For the next five years, she continued blogging in spite of the attacks, until retiring in April 2013.

Art
In 2017, she revealed that she had been living in Berlin under an alternate identity ("Elle Peril") as part of a durational performance. In the aftermath of revenge porn, she posed nude for artists in order to reclaim agency over her body and presented documentation of her life as Elle Peril in a solo exhibition at S0MA Gallery. Her work has been shown at Human Resources Los Angeles  and Transmediale.

Activism
In 2010, she co-organized the Feminist Coming Out Day campaign and the Rethinking Virginity conference

Later life
By 2018 Chen had put her undergraduate notoriety behind her, and, according to the New York Times, was devoting her time to "curating art shows and events focused on helping other women heal from trauma." 
.

References

External links
 
Lena Chen on Twitter

Harvard College alumni
Writers from San Francisco
American sex columnists
American women columnists
Living people
American women bloggers
American bloggers
1987 births
Feminist artists
American women non-fiction writers
21st-century American non-fiction writers
American women journalists of Asian descent
21st-century American women writers